William Holmes Hickox (March 28, 1942 – February 15, 1961) was an American pair skater who competed with his sister Laurie Hickox.  They won the bronze medal at the U.S. Championships, earning them the right to compete a month later at the World Championships in Prague.  They also finished sixth at the North American Figure Skating Championships that year.  They died along with their teammates on February 15, 1961 when Sabena Flight 548 crashed en route to the World Championships.  He was 19 years old.

Hickox was also a cadet at the United States Air Force Academy.

Results
Pairs with Hickox

External links
 U.S. Figure Skating biography

American male pair skaters
1942 births
1961 deaths
Victims of aviation accidents or incidents in Belgium
Victims of aviation accidents or incidents in 1961
20th-century American people